Arms and the Girl is a 1917 American silent drama film produced by Famous Players-Lasky and distributed by Paramount Pictures. It was directed by Joseph Kaufman and stars Billie Burke. The film is one of the few of director Kaufman's to survive and the earliest known Billie Burke silent to survive.

The film is based on a 1917 Broadway play which starred a young Fay Bainter.

Plot
As described in a film magazine, during August 1914 Ruth Sherwood (Burke), an American traveling through Belgium with her parents, is left behind in Beaupre while sending a message to her fiance in Paris. She is compelled to seek shelter at the Hotel Tete d'Or as there are no more trains that day. Here she meets another American, Wilfred Ferrers. Ruth's passport is stolen by Olga Karnovitch (Bates), a Russian spy, who leaves her Russian passport in Ruth's hands. 

The town is invaded by Germans who are headed towards Paris, and they make the inn their headquarters. Ferrers is discovered destroying the Russian passport and is ordered to be shot at once. Ruth comes to his assistance by claiming that he is her fiance. The German officer is skeptical, and he orders that they be married at once. The ceremony is held beneath the upheld swords of the Germans, and an embarrassing night follows as the couple retire to their room. Ferrers overcomes the sentinel at their door, dons his uniform, and forces the General (Trimble) at the point of a gun to give them a pass to get through the German lines into France. 

In the meantime, Jack Martin (David), Ruth's fiance, arrives, but she says that he is her chauffeur. Ferrers gives Jack the pass, but Ruth refuses to leave Ferrers, having fallen in love with her "husband." The Germans receive orders to move on and as Ferrers enters the inn to urge Ruth to depart at once, he is shot by the outraged General. Ruth borrows a smock from the innkeeper and with Ferrers makes her escape across the border into France.

Cast
Billie Burke as Ruth Sherwood
Thomas Meighan as Wilfred Ferrers
Louise Bates as Olga Karnovitch
J. Malcolm Dunn as Eugene
Arthur Bauer as Burgomaster
William David as Jack Martin
George S. Trimble as The General
Harry Lee
May De Lacy (uncredited)

Survival status
A copy of Arms and the Girl is preserved at the George Eastman House Motion Picture Collection in Rochester, New York.

References

External links

allmovie/synopsis; Arms and the Girl
Film still at www.silentera.com

1917 films
American silent feature films
American films based on plays
Paramount Pictures films
1917 drama films
Silent American drama films
Films directed by Joseph Kaufman
American black-and-white films
1910s American films